Maiwald or Maywald  is a German language habitational surname. Notable people with the name include:

 Anna Maiwald (1990), German athlete
 Armin Maiwald (1940), German author, television director and producer
 Karlene Maywald (1961), Australian National Party politician
 Roland Maywald (1948), former German badminton player 
 Willy Maywald (1907–1985), German photographer

References 

German-language surnames
German toponymic surnames